West Street Park is a public, urban park in Apex, North Carolina. It is located at the junction of West Street and First Street, a half-mile south west of the Apex Historic District.

The 1.3 acre park has a picnic shelter with grill, and a playground, and a basketball court.

References

Apex, North Carolina
Urban public parks
Parks in Wake County, North Carolina
Tourist attractions in Apex, North Carolina